Ethmia chrysopygella is a moth in the family Depressariidae. It is found in Azerbaijan, Russia, France, Switzerland, Austria, Italy and North Macedonia.

The larvae feed on Thalictrum species.

References

Moths described in 1846
chrysopygella
Moths of Europe
Moths of Asia